Professor Jean Venables CBE, BSc (Eng), MSc, DSc, FREng, CEng, CEnv, FICE, FCGI, MCIWEM (born June 1948) is a British civil engineer who in November 2008 became the 144th President of the Institution of Civil Engineers, the first woman to be elected to the position.

Career 
Venables has worked on flood risk management projects. She was chairman of the Thames Regional Flood Defence Committee for a period of nine years.

From 2003 to 2010 Venables was chair of the Thames Estuary Partnership, a British charity that provides a framework for managing the Thames Estuary.

She was also chief executive of the Association of Drainage Authorities (ADA), from Jan 2006 to March 2015, where she led ADA's role of representing organisations related to water level management and flood risk management, such as Internal Drainage Boards, flood defence committees, environmental agencies, local authorities and various associate members.

Venables has been associated with formation of CEEQUAL. From 2014 to 2016, Venables was chair of the Nuclear Liabilities Fund, succeeding Lady Balfour.

Awards and recognition 
Venables was made a Commander of the Order of the British Empire in the 2010 Birthday Honours. She had earlier been made an Officer of the Order of the British Empire (OBE) in the 2004 New Year Honours for services as Chairman of the Thames Region Flood Defence Committee and before that a Member of the Order of the British Empire (MBE) in the 1997 New Year Honours for services to civil engineering.

The University of Nottingham, The University of Kent, Kingston University and Abertay University have each awarded her an honorary doctorate.

She is also a Fellow of the Royal Academy of Engineering and a visiting professor at the University of Southampton and at Imperial College London (where she studied). Previously, she was a visiting professor at Strathclyde University.

In 2001, she was awarded the Garth Watson Medal for services to the Institution of Civil Engineers.

In 2011, the Institution of Civil Engineers instituted the Jean Venables Medal. It is awarded to its best Technician Professional Review candidate.

Personal life 
Venables is married to Roger Venables. They operate the company "Venables Consultancy". Roger Venables is Visiting Professor in Engineering for Sustainable Development at Queen's University, Belfast.

Bibliography

References

External links 
 Venables Consultancy
 Why professional institutions need to break down professional silos and focus on sustainable working – 'UrbanBuzz: Building Sustainable Communities' conference keynote presentation by Venables.

Commanders of the Order of the British Empire
Living people
Date of birth missing (living people)
British civil engineers
Fellows of the Royal Academy of Engineering
Female Fellows of the Royal Academy of Engineering
Alumni of Imperial College London
Presidents of the Institution of Civil Engineers
1948 births
21st-century women engineers